YO! Company is a British holding company wholly owned by entrepreneur Simon Woodroffe. The most prominent company in the YO! group is the YO! Sushi chain.

The YO! Company has several subsidiary companies and brands including:
 YO! Sushi - a chain of sushi restaurants
 YOTEL - a chain of capsule hotels at airports and various cities
 YO! Japan - A Japanese-inspired clothing brand
 RadiYO! - a series of radio shows about business
 YO! Zone - spa and health club
 YO! Home - modern style city centre apartments
In July 2016 Simon Woodroffe joined with British firm Glenn Howells Architects.

References

External links
 YO! Company website
 Preview of the Yotel brand in Hotel Management International

Companies based in the London Borough of Hackney
Holding companies established in 1997